Anthony Henderson (born June 17, 1973), better known as Krayzie Bone, is an American rapper, singer, producer, and entrepreneur. He is a member of the rap group Bone Thugs-n-Harmony.

Personal life

Henderson comes from a fourth generation family of Jehovah's Witnesses, and as such does not celebrate Christmas. He believes many rappers are unintentionally following the agenda of the Illuminati.

Solo career

After finding success with Bone Thugs-n-Harmony, Krayzie Bone recorded his solo debut, Thug Mentality 1999, in 1999. The album was released as a double disc set, featuring a large selection of guest appearances, including Bone Thugs-n-Harmony, Mo Thugs, Mariah Carey, ThugLine, The Marley Brothers, Big Pun, Fat Joe, Cuban Link, Gangsta Boo, E-40, 8 Ball & MJG, Kurupt, Naughty By Nature and Snoop Dogg. Largely produced by multi instrumentalist Romeo Antonio The album was certified platinum by the RIAA.

In 2001, Krayzie released Thug On Da Line, which received generally positive reviews from music critics and went gold.

In 2005 Krayzie Bone was featured in the song "Ridin'" by Chamillionaire. "Ridin'" was awarded "Best Rap Performance by a Duo or Group" at the 49th Annual Grammy Awards. It was also nominated for Best Rap Song. It became number one in December on the Piczo Chart 3 months after its physical release. The song also topped the Billboard Hot 100 and peaked at number 2 on the UK Singles Chart when it was released there. The song ranked #3 on Rolling Stone's "100 Best Songs of 2006" and #91 on VH1's
"100 Greatest Songs of Hip Hop". It was the best selling ringtone in 2006, with 3.2 million sales, certified by the RIAA as the first multi-platinum Mastertone artist in history. It was also awarded the last Best Rap Video at the MTV Video Music Awards, which was awarded in 2006.

During an April 2014 press conference, Krayzie Bone announced that the first installment of the Chasing the Devil trilogy album would be released July 22, 2014 by RBC Records. However, it was pushed back and ultimately released on November 20, 2015.

Business career 
Aside from music, Krayzie Bone has since then ventured into the business world. He was a founding member of Mo Thugs Family, a collective of Cleveland-based rap and Hip-Hop musical acts. He broke apart from the group in 1999 to form ThugLine Records, or TL. He had administrated the label to fellow Bone Thugs member Wish Bone as its president and co-CEO. The group has presently reunited and continue to tour as a whole. In many videos he can be spotted wearing a chain that says TL. In 2010 the name ThugLine Records was changed to The Life Entertainment. In order to reach out to more artists and identify the best talent for the label, Conquer The Industry was developed as an internet channel to help up and coming music artists break into the music industry. As a part of his entrepreneurial drive, Krayzie Bone launched a clothing and accessory line named "TL Apparel" which is a direct tie to his music. Many of his fans support his clothing line as they joined him in the grand opening of the store in Los Angeles. 
In 2018 Krayzie Bone signed a deal to distribute his digital media company,”Krayzie Bone Media” with The Digital Soapbox Network.
His first show “Quick Fix”-The Afterhours was his first project with the network. In 2019 he started the conspiracy podcast #TruthTalks which has garnered a large online following.

Current 
Most recently, Krayzie Bone has found renewed public interest after Bone Thugs-N-Harmony battled long time rivals Three Six Mafia in one of the more notable Verzuz showdowns. With his name back in the spotlight, Krayzie has seized this opportunity to start the “Spread the Love” foundation, a venture in which investments are used to help the youth excel in music and arts within the Cleveland community. On the music side of things, Krayzie Bone teamed up with Fatlip (of The Pharcyde) to assist him on the lead single (“Dust in the Wind”) for his album, “Sccit & Siavash The Grouch Present… Fatlip - Torpor”. The single dropped on February 18, 2022 and marks the first time a member of Bone Thugs collaborated with a member of The Pharcyde.

Discography

Solo albums
Thug Mentality 1999 (1999)
Thug on da Line (2001)
Gemini: Good vs. Evil (2005)
Chasing the Devil: Temptation (2015)
Eternal Legend (2017)
E. 1999: The LeathaFace Project (2017)
Quick Fix: Level 2 (2019)
Leaves of Legends (2021)
Krayzie Melodies: Melodious, Vol. 1 (2022)

Collaboration albums
Thug Brothers 2 with Young Noble (2017)
New Waves with Bizzy Bone (2017)
Thug Brothers 3 with Young Noble (2017)

Awards

Grammy Award
1997: "Best Rap Performance by a Duo or Group" (Tha Crossroads) (with Bone Thugs-n-Harmony)
2007: "Best Rap Performance by a Duo or Group" (Ridin') (with Chamillionaire)

References

External links 

1974 births
Living people
20th-century American businesspeople
21st-century American businesspeople
African-American businesspeople
African-American Christians
African-American fashion designers
American fashion designers
African-American male rappers
American male rappers
African-American record producers
American fashion businesspeople
American hip hop record producers
American hip hop singers
American music industry executives
Bone Thugs-n-Harmony members
Businesspeople from Ohio
Grammy Award winners for rap music
Rappers from Cleveland
Gangsta rappers
Horrorcore artists
21st-century American rappers
21st-century American male musicians
American Jehovah's Witnesses
20th-century African-American people
21st-century African-American musicians